Danapur Assembly constituency is one of 243 constituencies of legislative assembly of Bihar. It comes under Pataliputra Lok Sabha constituency along with other assembly constituencies viz. Masaurhi, Maner, Phulwari, Paliganj and Bikram.

Overview
Danapur comprises CD Block Danapur-Cum-Khagaul.

Members of Vidhan Sabha

Election results

2020

2015

2010

2000 Vidhan Sabha
 Lalu Prasad Yadav (RJD) : 64,085 votes  
 Rama Nand Yadav (BJP) : 46,530

2002 by-poll
 Rama Nand Yadav (RJD) : 75,935 votes 
 SatyanaranSinha (BJP) : 17,928

1977 Vidhan Sabha
 Ram Lakhan Singh Yadav (INC) : 33,989 votes
 Chhabila Singh (JNP) : 29,292

1972 Vidhan Sabha
 Budh Deo Singh (INC) : 23,150 votes
 Keshav Prasad (SOP) : 15,843 
 Ram Swarath Singh (NCO) : 9,550 
 Tej Narain Prasad (Bharatiya Jana Sangh) : 5,456

1957 Vidhan Sabha
 Jagat Narayan Lal (INC) : 7,042 votes
 Radhey Shyam Singh (IND) : 6074

See also
 List of Assembly constituencies of Bihar
 Danapur

References

External links
 

Assembly constituencies in Patna district
Politics of Patna district
Assembly constituencies of Bihar